Romano Galvani (born 25 August 1962 in Manerbio) is a retired Italian professional football player.

Honours
 Serie A champion: 1988/89.

References

1962 births
Living people
Italian footballers
Serie A players
Serie B players
U.S. Cremonese players
U.S. Avellino 1912 players
Bologna F.C. 1909 players
Delfino Pescara 1936 players
Inter Milan players

Association football midfielders